Romar Benjamin Gil Aguilar (born October 6, 1972) is a Mexican former professional baseball infielder. He played in Major League Baseball (MLB) for the Texas Rangers and Anaheim Angels. He is infield coach for the Los Angeles Angels of MLB, and as manager for the Tomateros de Culiacán of the Mexican Pacific League.

Early career
Gil was a star pitcher for Castle Park High School in Chula Vista, California. In , he went 6–3 with 89 strikeouts and a San Diego County leading 0.52 earned run average. Gil was also a good hitter, however, and when the Texas Rangers selected Gil nineteenth overall in the 1991 Major League Baseball draft, it was as a shortstop.

Professional career

Texas Rangers
He made his major league debut in the  season opener at twenty years old, going 0-for-3 with a walk in four plate appearances. By late May, however, he was back in the minors with the Double-A Tulsa Drillers after batting .123 with two runs batted in for the Rangers.

He would not return to the majors until the  season. On May 3, his first major league home run accounted for the Rangers' lone run in a 5–1 loss to the Seattle Mariners. He followed this up with home runs in his next two games on his way to a career best nine for the season. He also appeared in a career high 130 games, and posted career highs in runs batted in (46), runs (36), hits (91) and extra-base hits (32), while also providing a steady glove at short (.974 fielding percentage, and a league-leading 5.18 range factor per nine innings as a shortstop).

A herniated disc in Spring training kept Gil off the  opening day roster. By the time he was ready to return, off-season acquisition Kevin Elster had won the starting job, and Gil found himself back in the minors with the Oklahoma City 89ers. He received a call up to the majors that September, and was 2-for-5 in seven plate appearances.

Calgary Cannons
Gil was traded following the 1997 season to the Chicago White Sox for pitchers Al Levine and Larry Thomas. Gil spent his one season in the White Sox organization with the Pacific Coast League's Calgary Cannons, where he batted .248 with fourteen home runs and 69 RBIs (a career high for Gil at any level). Coincidentally, Gil also spent the  season with Calgary after they became a Florida Marlins affiliate, and he was drafted by the Marlins in the  minor league draft.

Anaheim Angels
Just as spring training  was set to begin, Gil signed as a free agent with the Anaheim Angels. Slated to be the backup to incumbent Gary DiSarcina, Gil soon found himself starting when an injury ended DiSarcina's season.

In , Gil actually saw more playing time at second base than he did at short. He had a far more limited role than he had his previous two seasons in Anaheim, however, he made it to the postseason for the only time in his career. In game two of the 2002 American League Division Series against the New York Yankees, Gil had an RBI single off Andy Petitte. In game four, he was 3-for-3 with a run scored. In the Angels' 2002 World Series victory over the San Francisco Giants, Gil went 4-for-5 with a double and a run scored.

Minor League journeyman
Gil's  season got off to a slow start, going 0-for-14. The Angels released him in early August with a .192 batting average, one home run and nine RBIs. Shortly afterwards, he signed with the Cleveland Indians. He was released at the end of the season after batting .139 for the Triple-A Buffalo Bisons. Over the next two seasons, Gil spent time in the Colorado Rockies, Chicago Cubs, Detroit Tigers, Seattle Mariners and New York Mets organizations, but failed to make the Major League roster of any of these teams. Along the way, he also landed on the Mexican League's Tijuana Toros.

When the Mets released Gil in July , it would turn out to be his final stint with a major league franchise. After finishing out the 2005 season with the New Jersey Jackals of the Canadian-American Association, Gil would spend the next six seasons playing ball in Mexico. In , he won the Mexican League Championship with Sultanes de Monterrey. He spent one last season with the Fort Worth Cats of the North American League before retiring.

Career statistics

Gil pitched once while in the Chicago Cubs organization, once in the Mets organization and once for the Jackals. He pitched a total of four innings, allowing two hits and no earned runs.

Coaching career

Tomateros de Culiacán
Gil's coaching career began in 2014, as he became manager for the Tomateros de Culiacán of the Mexican Pacific League (LMP), a winter ball club where he previously played for 13 seasons and won six championships with. He led the team to a championship in his first season, and was later brought back for the 2015–16 season. In 2015, the Tomateros posted a disappointing 28–40 record and did not make the playoffs, leading to Gil's firing after the season. After another disappointing year in 2016, the Tomateros announced that Gil would return as manager for the 2017–18 season. The Tomateros won their second title under Gil, defeating the Mayos de Navojoa in the LMP Championship Series 4–3. After the season, Gil surprisingly announced he was stepping down as manager in order to attend to personal and family matters. However, Gil once again returned as manager following another mediocre campaign in 2018, and went on to win back-to-back championships during the 2019–20 and 2020–21 seasons.

Mariachis de Guadalajara
Gil was named the inaugural manager of the Mariachis de Guadalajara, an expansion franchise of the Mexican Baseball League (LMB) that began play in the 2021 season. He led them to a stellar 46–17 regular season record, a first-place finish in the LMB North division, and a playoff berth. However, the Mariachis fell to the eventual league-champion Toros de Tijuana in the North Division Championship Series. Gil was voted LMB Manager of the Year following the season.

Mexico national team
In 2021, Gil was selected as manager for the Mexico national team at the 2020 Summer Olympics. Mexico lost to the Dominican Republic, Japan, and Israel. He managed Mexico in the 2023 World Baseball Classic.

Los Angeles Angels
On January 5, 2022, Gil was announced as a new coach for the Los Angeles Angels of Major League Baseball (MLB) for the 2022 season.

Personal life
Gil was born in Mexico, but grew up in Chula Vista, California. His mother died while he was in high school. He and his wife, Carly, reside in Keller, Texas, with their two children, Mateo and Gehrig. Mateo was drafted in the third round of the 2018 Major League Baseball draft by the St. Louis Cardinals.

References

External links

1972 births
2006 World Baseball Classic players
Anaheim Angels players
Baseball players at the 2007 Pan American Games
Baseball players from Baja California
Buffalo Bisons (minor league) players
Butte Copper Kings players
Calgary Cannons players
Charlotte Rangers players
Fort Worth Cats players
Gastonia Rangers players
Iowa Cubs players
Living people
Major League Baseball players from Mexico
Major League Baseball shortstops
Mexican expatriate baseball players in Canada
Mexican expatriate baseball players in the United States
New Jersey Jackals players
Norfolk Tides players
Oklahoma City 89ers players
Pan American Games bronze medalists for Mexico
Pan American Games medalists in baseball
People from Tijuana
Salt Lake Stingers players
Sportspeople from Chula Vista, California
Texas Rangers players
Toledo Mud Hens players
Tulsa Drillers players
Caribbean Series managers
People from Keller, Texas
Medalists at the 2007 Pan American Games